Pierson Creek is a stream in Woodbury County and Cherokee County, in the US state of Iowa. It is a tributary of the Little Sioux River.

The name of the stream was named after Andrew Pierson, a pioneer settler.

See also
List of rivers of Iowa
 Little Sioux River

References

Rivers of Cherokee County, Iowa
Rivers of Woodbury County, Iowa
Rivers of Iowa